Myrt and Marge is a 1933 American pre-Code Universal Studios feature film, starring Myrtle Vail and Donna Damerel. The film is noteworthy today because it co-stars Ted Healy and his Stooges, shortly before the trio split from him and became the Three Stooges (Curly Howard, Moe Howard and Larry Fine). The team included Bonnie Bonnell, who was a short-lived female Stooge.

Plot
Myrt Spear's touring vaudeville revue is full of talent and bound for Broadway, but low on funds. Conniving and lecherous producer Mr. Jackson helps the show so he can romance the young star, Marge Minter.

Myrt, and Marge's boyfriend Eddie Hanley, step in to save the revue and Marge. Mullins and his helpers are stagehands with hopes to join the show, but mostly deal with the antics of backstage crasher Bonnie.

Cast
 Myrtle Vail as Myrt Spear
 Donna Damerel as Marge Minster
 Eddie Foy, Jr. as Eddie Hanley
 Ted Healy as Mullins
 Thomas E. Jackson as Jackson the Angel
 Ray Hedge as Clarence
 Grace Hayes as Grace
 Trixie Friganza as Mrs. Minter
 J. Farrell MacDonald as Grady
 Moe Howard as Mullins' Helper
 Larry Fine as Mullins' Helper
 Curly Howard as Mullins' Helper
 Bonnie Bonnell as Suzannah (uncredited)

Radio program

Myrt and Marge was a popular radio serial created by and starring Myrtle Vail and Damerel. The show aired on CBS Radio from 1931 to 1946, and in syndication from 1946 to 1947.

Reception
The film was a box office disappointment for Universal.

In popular culture
This film is shown in a scene from the 2000 film, O Brother, Where Art Thou?.

See also
 The Three Stooges filmography

References

External links
 Myrt and Marge, imdb.com 
 Myrt and Marge, ThreeStooges.net

The Three Stooges films
1933 films
Universal Pictures films
1933 comedy films
American black-and-white films
Films based on radio series
American comedy films
1930s American films